Christopher Schorch (born 30 January 1989) is a German former professional footballer who played as a centre-back.

Career
Schorch came through the ranks of Hertha BSC, and made his Bundesliga debut in the closing stages of the 2006–07 season. In July 2007, he signed with Real Madrid for €600,000, being assigned to its B side, which had been freshly relegated to the third division.

After two years in Spain, Schorch returned to Germany and signed a four-year contract with 1. FC Köln, the transfer fee was believed to be €1 million.

He joined MSV Duisburg for the 2014–15 season. At the end of season, Duisburg achieved promotion to 2. Bundesliga, however with Schorch not becoming a regular, starting only in 13 matches and being benched for 20 times. Accordingly, he did not receive an extension of his contract and remained a free agent until October when he was signed by his former club Energie Cottbus for the remainder of the 3. Liga season.

In January 2019, Schorch was one of two players to be suspended by KFC Uerdingen 05 for "disciplinary reasons". On 1 May 2019, it was confirmed, that Schorch would join 1. FC Saarbrücken for the 2019–20 season on a two-year deal.

In March 2022, Schorch agreed the termination of his contract with Regionalliga side Wuppertaler SV following a lengthy injury. Shortly afterwards, he announced his retirement from playing.

Career statistics

1.Includes DFB-Pokal and Copa del Rey.

References

External links
 
 
 

1989 births
Living people
Sportspeople from Halle (Saale)
German footballers
Footballers from Saxony-Anhalt
Association football defenders
Germany youth international footballers
Bundesliga players
2. Bundesliga players
3. Liga players
Regionalliga players
Hertha BSC II players
Hertha BSC players
Real Madrid Castilla footballers
1. FC Köln players
1. FC Köln II players
FC Energie Cottbus players
VfL Bochum II players
MSV Duisburg players
FSV Frankfurt players
KFC Uerdingen 05 players
1. FC Saarbrücken players
Wuppertaler SV players
German expatriate footballers
German expatriate sportspeople in Spain
Expatriate footballers in Spain